The Amazonian Trapeze or Leticia Trapeze is a geographical corridor located in the extreme south of the Amazonas Department of Colombia, which constitutes the southernmost part of the country and allows it to have banks on the Amazon River. At this end of the department, which extends like a peninsula between Brazil and Peru, is the departmental capital of Leticia.

Location
The Amazon Trapeze, which emerges from a vaster territory to the north, is one of two parts of the Amazonas Department in Colombia. The Amazon Trapeze is located between the Putumayo River to the north and the Amazon River to the south, and between the border with Brazil to the east and the border with Peru to the west. Thus, a trapezoidal strip of about 50 km in the Putumayo and 100 km in the Amazon and 150 km in length between both rivers is formed. The trapezoidal shape gives the name to this Colombian geographic arm.

The Amazon Trapeze is also the location of the Amacayacu National Park, which contains a great wealth of fauna and flora and one of the main objectives of national and international ecotourism.

History
The trapeze was originally part of a larger disputed territory between Colombia and Peru, through which the former sought a direct exit towards the Amazon River. During the territorial dispute, the Peruvian government in the town of Leticia established the Colony of Leticia, also known as the Colony of San Antonio, a project through which the area would be inhabited by Peruvian citizens and thus oppose Colombian claims over the territory. The region's current borders came into existence as a result of the Salomón–Lozano Treaty signed between Colombia and Peru in 1922, which established the modern Colombia–Peru border, ending a longstanding dispute that existed since the independence of both states. Local dissatisfaction with the treaty, however, led up to the Colombia–Peru War in 1932, the last conflict between both states.

Once hostilities between both states met a final end, the first arrival of Colombian settlers took place in 1930.

Human settlement
The Colombian towns of Leticia (capital of the department of Amazonas) and Puerto Nariño, both on the banks of the Amazon River, and the city of Tarapacá on the banks of the Putumayo River, are all in the Trapeze. Also in the region are protected indigenous settlements.

See also
 Tres Fronteras
 Colombia–Peru War

References

Geography of Amazonas Department